German submarine U-1210 was a Type VIIC U-boat of Nazi Germany's Kriegsmarine during World War II.

She was ordered on 2 April 1942, and was laid down on 14 July 1943 at F Schichau GmbH, Danzig, as yard number 1580. She was launched on 9 February 1944 and commissioned under the command of Oberleutnant zur See Paul Gabert on 22 April 1944.

Design
German Type VIIC submarines were preceded by the shorter Type VIIB submarines. U-1210 had a displacement of  when at the surface and  while submerged. She had two shafts and two  propellers.

U-1210 was fitted with five  torpedo tubes (four fitted at the bow and one at the stern), fourteen torpedoes or 26 TMA mines, one  SK C/35 naval gun, (220 rounds), one  Flak M42 and two twin  C/30 anti-aircraft guns. The boat had a complement of between 44 — 52 men.

Service history
U-1210 was sunk on 3 May 1945 by US fighter-bombers of XXIX TAC 9th AF off the U-boat base at Eckernförde.

References

Bibliography

External links

German Type VIIC submarines
U-boats commissioned in 1944
World War II submarines of Germany
Ships built in Danzig
1944 ships
Maritime incidents in May 1945
Ships built by Schichau